Markel Irizar Aranburu (born 5 February 1980) is a Spanish former professional road racing cyclist, who rode professionally between 2004 and 2019 for the ,  and  teams.

Born in Oñati, Basque Country, Irizar currently resides in Arrasate, Basque Country, Spain. Irizar was diagnosed and treated for testicular cancer in 2002.

In February 2019, Irizar announced his plans to retire from the peloton after the 2019 Clásica de San Sebastián, in early August.

Major results

2010
 5th Overall Tour du Poitou-Charentes
1st Stage 4
 5th Chrono des Nations
2011
 1st  Overall Vuelta a Andalucía
 10th Chrono des Nations
2012
 9th Overall Three Days of De Panne
2017
  Combativity award Stage 2 Vuelta a España

Grand Tour general classification results timeline

References

External links 

 
 
 Markel Irizar: Cycling Base
 Markel Irizar: Cycling Quotient
 Markel Irizar: Trek Factory Racing

Cyclists from the Basque Country (autonomous community)
Spanish male cyclists
1980 births
Living people
People from Oñati
Sportspeople from Gipuzkoa